Carol Ann Peterka (born December 23, 1963 in Little Falls, Minnesota) is an American former handball player who competed in the 1988 Summer Olympics, in the 1992 Summer Olympics, and in the 1996 Summer Olympics. Outside of her athletic career, Peterka was a teacher in Osceola County, Florida.

References

1963 births
Living people
People from Little Falls, Minnesota
American female handball players
Olympic handball players of the United States
Handball players at the 1988 Summer Olympics
Handball players at the 1992 Summer Olympics
Handball players at the 1996 Summer Olympics
Schoolteachers from Florida
American women educators
21st-century American women
Medalists at the 1995 Pan American Games
Medalists at the 1987 Pan American Games
Pan American Games gold medalists for the United States
Pan American Games medalists in handball